Vesyolaya is a rural locality (a village) in Roksomskoye Rural Settlement, Vashkinsky District, Vologda Oblast, Russia. The population was 25 as of 2002.

Geography 
Vesyolaya is located 24 km northeast of Lipin Bor (the district's administrative centre) by road. Ikonnikovo is the nearest rural locality.

References 

Rural localities in Vashkinsky District